Rothiemurchus Forest is a remnant of the Caledonian Forest at  near Aviemore, Inverness-shire, Scotland. It is in the Highland region. 

The forest is popular for recreation and contains important independent wildlife, including the osprey, Scottish crossbill, capercaillie, crested tit and European wildcat.

Stretching from the River Spey to the high mountain plateau, Rothiemurchus sits within the Cairngorms National Park.

Much of the forest is within the Rothiemurchus Estate, in the ownership of the Grant family since the 1540s. The estate is now owned and managed by Johnnie Grant, 13th Earl of Dysart and 17th Laird of Rothiemurchus, along with his family. The land was also managed by Philippa Grant, Countess of Dysart till September 2022, when she was killed in a road traffic collision. In 2014, Rothiemurchus Upper Forest - covering  - was sold to Forestry Commission Scotland (now Forestry and Land Scotland) for £7.4 million.

References

External links

 Rothiemurchus Website

Badenoch and Strathspey
Forests and woodlands of Scotland
Highland Estates